The Dog Branch School is a historic one-room schoolhouse building in rural southeastern Carroll County, Arkansas. It is a single story gable-roofed structure, built out of rough-hewn fieldstone. It has a very limited, vernacular amount of Romanesque Revival and Italianate features, including an arched entry opening and segmented-arch openings for the windows. The school was built in 1898, and is unusual mainly because most district schools built in the region at the time were built out of wood. Its builders, the Bailey Brothers, also built the Stamps Store in Osage.

The building was listed on the National Register of Historic Places in 1992.

See also
National Register of Historic Places listings in Carroll County, Arkansas

References

School buildings on the National Register of Historic Places in Arkansas
One-room schoolhouses in Arkansas
School buildings completed in 1898
Buildings and structures in Carroll County, Arkansas
National Register of Historic Places in Carroll County, Arkansas
1898 establishments in Arkansas